Preservation Act 1 is a concept album and the 12th studio album by the English rock group the Kinks, released 16 November 1973 by RCA Records.

Preservation Act 1 did not sell well (peaking on the Billboard 200 at No. 177). However, it was well received by many critics at the time. A review in Rolling Stone by Ken Barnes was critical of Ray Davies' "tendency toward vaudevillian excess," but overall he rated Preservation as a "highly listenable, enjoyable album." Barnes singled out "Sitting in the Midday Sun" as a "wistfully irresistible" number and labeled "One of the Survivors" the Kinks' "best outright rocker" in years. Gary Lucas, reviewing Preservation Act 1 for Zoo World, also had high praise for the work, stating: "Dare I say it is one of the nicest albums to be released this year (if not the best)? Of course I will." Focusing on the musical theater aspects of the LP, Barbara Charone ranked the album as one of the "most impressive" of the Kinks' career.

Some more recent reviews of Preservation Act 1 have been sympathetic to its theatrical ambitions, such as AllMusic's Stephen Thomas Erlewine, who declared "Sweet Lady Genevieve" to be the "real candidate for Davies' forgotten masterpiece".

The 1991 CD reissue on Rhino was a 2-CD set combining Preservation Act 1 with its 1974 follow-up Preservation Act 2. It contained one bonus track ("Preservation") and an extended mix of "Money & Corruption/I Am Your Man", featuring an extra instrumental break.

The 1998 CD reissue of Preservation Act 1 on Velvel includes the single versions of "Preservation" and "One of the Survivors", neither of which is available on the original vinyl release.

Cultural references 
The chorus from side 2's "Money and Corruption" was used by the hackers group Anonymous when attacking governmental websites during the 2014 World Cup.

Track listing

Personnel 
The Kinks
Ray Davies – vocals, guitar, harmonica
Dave Davies – guitar, vocals
John Dalton – bass
Mick Avory – drums
John Gosling – keyboards

Additional personnel
Alan Holmes – brass
Laurie Brown – brass
John Beecham – brass
Krysia Kocjan, Lee Pavey, Lewis Rich, Pamela Travis, Sue Brown – additional singers

Technical
Dave Davies – engineer
Roger Beale – engineer
Pat Doyle – art direction
Chris Hopper – photography

References 

The Kinks albums
1973 albums
1974 albums
Rock operas
Concept albums
RCA Records albums
Albums produced by Ray Davies